Hugh Hale Franklin (August 24, 1916 – September 26, 1986) was an American theatre and soap opera actor. He was born in Muskogee, Oklahoma.

Franklin was best known for his role as Dr. Charles Tyler on All My Children, a role he played from the show's first episode in 1970 until 1983. He was forced to retire as his hearing loss, which had previously been gradual, started to affect his ability to receive cues.

He also had roles on the soap operas As the World Turns, Dark Shadows, and Love of Life.

Prior to All My Children, Franklin appeared in such Broadway productions as The Joyous Season, I Know My Love, and Medea.  Other theatre credits include Harriet, The Cherry Orchard, One Man Show, and Alice in Wonderland.

He was married for 40 years to Newbery Medal-winning author Madeleine L'Engle. She wrote a book about their marriage, called Two-Part Invention: The Story of a Marriage (1988), and frequently mentioned him in her other non-fiction titles.

Franklin died of cancer on September 26, 1986. He and L'Engle had three children: Josephine, Maria, and Bion Franklin.

External links
 
 
 
 .
 .

1916 births
1986 deaths
Actors Studio alumni
American male soap opera actors
Place of death missing
20th-century American male actors
American male stage actors
People from Muskogee, Oklahoma